Zofia Zakrzewska (7 April 1916 – 8 January 1999) was a Polish scoutmaster of the Polish Scouting Association and Naczelnik ZHP (1956–1964).

See also

 Scouting in Poland

1916 births
1999 deaths
Polish Scouts and Guides